Jacob Andersen may refer to:

 Jacob Andersen (singer), Danish singer
 Jacob Andersen (footballer) (born 2004), Danish footballer
 Jacob Dehn Andersen (born 1995), Danish footballer
 Jacob Rolsdorph Andersen (1828–1901), Norwegian judge
 Jacob Andersen (sailor) (1892–1955), Danish sailor
 Jacob Andersen, co-founder of IO Interactive
 Jacob Andersen, Danish co-creator of Dracco's Filly Funtasia

See also
Jacob Anderson (disambiguation)
Jacob Andersson (born 1995), Swedish ice hockey player